is a Japanese singer and musician. Her career started in the late 1970s performing Japanese new music. By the mid-1980s she was performing music with electronic instruments, with many albums produced by Haruomi Hosono. Her later work has led to European classical music, French chanson and early 20th-century European Jazz, which she sings in several languages (most often French).

Discography

Albums
おもちゃ箱 第一幕 (1979)
On The Street (1980)
Make Up (1981)
Tutu (1983, collaborated with Telex)
Parallelisme (1984)
Boy Soprano (1985)
Echo De Miharu (1987)
Passepied (1989)
心臓の上 (1990)
父とピストル Der Vater und die Pistole (1991)
希望の泉 Source d' espoir (1992)
La Voix De Paris (1992)
Chanson Solaire (1995)
Swing Slow (with Haruomi Hosono) (1996)
Rodéo De Paris (1997)
L'Assassinat De La Rue Du Pélican (2000)
Frou-Frou (2001)
Corset (2003)
Le Judas (2008)
Madame Crooner (2013)
Moonray (2015)
Voyage Secret = 秘密の旅 (2021)

Singles and EPs
ラブ・ステップ (1978)
気まぐれハイウェイ (1979)
L'Amour Toujours (1983, collaborated with Telex)
Petit Paradis (Just Around The Corner) (1983)
Heidenröslein (1985)
Ave Maria (1985)
シチリアーノ (1989)
マドンナ (1991)
ボンジュール・クク (1992)

References

External links
Official Site
Discogs Page

1960 births
Living people
Musicians from Tokyo